Harrison R. Crandall (November 23, 1887 – December 14, 1970) was an American photographer and painter known for his images of Grand Teton National Park.

References 

20th-century American photographers
20th-century American painters
American male painters
1887 births
1970 deaths
20th-century American male artists